Carlton is a city in Dickinson County, Kansas, United States.  As of the 2020 census, the population of the city was 40.

History

Early history

For many millennia, the Great Plains of North America was inhabited by nomadic Native Americans.  From the 16th century to 18th century, the Kingdom of France claimed ownership of large parts of North America.  In 1762, after the French and Indian War, France secretly ceded New France to Spain, per the Treaty of Fontainebleau.

19th century
In 1802, Spain returned most of the land to France.  In 1803, most of the land for modern day Kansas was acquired by the United States from France as part of the 828,000 square mile Louisiana Purchase for 2.83 cents per acre.

In 1854, the Kansas Territory was organized, then in 1861 Kansas became the 34th U.S. state.  In 1857, Dickinson County was established within the Kansas Territory, which included the land for modern day Carlton.

Carlton was a station and shipping point on the Missouri Pacific Railroad.

A post office was opened in Carlton in 1872, and remained in operation until it was discontinued in 1995.

Geography
Carlton is located at  (38.686786, -97.294015).

Demographics

2010 census
As of the census of 2010, there were 42 people, 16 households, and 14 families living in the city. The racial makeup of the city was 100.0% White.

There were 16 households, of which 37.5% had children under the age of 18 living with them, 81.3% were married couples living together, 6.3% had a female householder with no husband present, and 12.5% were non-families. 12.5% of all households were made up of individuals, and 6.3% had someone living alone who was 65 years of age or older. The average household size was 2.63 and the average family size was 2.86.

The median age in the city was 46.5 years. 28.6% of residents were under the age of 18; 0.0% were between the ages of 18 and 24; 19.1% were from 25 to 44; 26.1% were from 45 to 64; and 26.2% were 65 years of age or older. The gender makeup of the city was 52.4% male and 47.6% female.

2000 census
As of the census of 2000, there were 38 people, 16 households, and 11 families living in the city. The racial makeup of the city was 100.00% White.

There were 16 households, out of which 31.3% had children under the age of 18 living with them, 62.5% were married couples living together, 6.3% had a female householder with no husband present, and 31.3% were non-families. 31.3% of all households were made up of individuals, and 6.3% had someone living alone who was 65 years of age or older. The average household size was 2.38 and the average family size was 2.91.

In the city, the population was spread out, with 23.7% under the age of 18, 5.3% from 18 to 24, 34.2% from 25 to 44, 23.7% from 45 to 64, and 13.2% who were 65 years of age or older. The median age was 39 years. For every 100 females, there were 100.0 males. For every 100 females age 18 and over, there were 107.1 males.

The median income for a household in the city was $33,125, and the median income for a family was $33,125. Males had a median income of $22,188 versus $13,750 for females. The per capita income for the city was $9,750. None of the population and none of the families were below the poverty line.

Education
The community is served by Chapman USD 473 public school district.  The Chapman High School mascot is Chapman Fighting Irish.

See also
 Holland Township, Dickinson County, Kansas

References

Further reading

 Carlton Area History: Carlton - Elmo - Holland, Dickinson County, Kansas; Carlton Book Committee; Bell Books; 1995.

External links

 Carlton - Directory of Public Officials
 Historic Images of Carlton, Special Photo Collections at Wichita State University Library
 Carlton city map, KDOT

Cities in Kansas
Cities in Dickinson County, Kansas
1872 establishments in Kansas
Populated places established in 1872